Evgeny Katichev (born September 3, 1986) is a Russian professional ice hockey defenceman currently an unrestricted free agent who most recently played for HC Vityaz in the Kontinental Hockey League (KHL). He has formerly played in the KHL with HC MVD, Traktor Chelyabinsk and Neftekhimik Nizhnekamsk.

References

External links

1986 births
Living people
HC MVD players
HC Neftekhimik Nizhnekamsk players
Traktor Chelyabinsk players
HC Vityaz players
Russian ice hockey defencemen